United States Senate elections in Pennsylvania occur when voters in the U.S. Commonwealth of Pennsylvania select an individual to represent the state in the United States Senate in either of the state's two seats allotted by the U.S. Constitution. Regularly scheduled general elections occur on Election Day, coinciding with various other federal, statewide, and local races.

Per the original text of the U.S. Constitution, each state was allotted two U.S. Senators selected by the state legislature for staggered six-year terms. After the election of the founding members of the U.S. Senate in 1788, the Senate was divided into three groups, or "classes" (Class 1, Class 2, and Class 3) to stagger the six-year terms of its members. Per Article I, Section 3, Clause 2 of the Constitution, the founding members of Class 1 would serve two years, Class 2 four years, and Class 3 six years. All Senators elected thereafter would serve full six-year terms such that one-third of the Senate would be up for re-election every two years. Pennsylvania was assigned a Class 1 seat and Class 3 seat. Since the passage of the 17th Amendment to the Constitution in 1913, U.S. Senators are elected directly to six-year terms by the voters of each state at the general election held on Election Day. Special elections may be held to fill mid-term vacancies by electing an individual to serve the remainder of the unexpired term. The next Class 1 U.S. Senate election in Pennsylvania is scheduled for November 5, 2024, and the next Class 3 election in Pennsylvania is scheduled for November 7, 2028.

The list below contains election returns from all nineteen Class 1 and twenty-one Class 3 post-17th Amendment U.S. Senate elections in Pennsylvania, including special elections, sorted by year and beginning with the first in 1914 and the most recent in 2022. Incumbent Senators are listed as well as elected Senators and runner(s)-up in each election, including major third-party candidates (garnering 5% or more of the popular vote). Parties are color-coded to the left of a Senator's or candidate's name according to the key below. The popular vote and percentage margins listed in the "Margin" column are the differences between the total votes received and percentage of the popular vote received by the top two finishers in the corresponding election (i.e. the margin-of-victory of an elected Senator over the nearest competitor).

List of recent elections 
 Parties

Class 1 

Note: Asterisk (*) next to year denotes a special election.

Class 3 

Note: Asterisk (*) next to year denotes a special election.

Notes

Graphs of results

Class 1 results from 1916 to 2018

Class 3 results from 1914 to 2022

See also 
List of United States senators from Pennsylvania
List of Pennsylvania gubernatorial elections
List of United States presidential elections in Pennsylvania
Elections in Pennsylvania
Government of Pennsylvania

References

External links 
Pennsylvania Department of State Election Returns Portal
Pennsylvania Senatorial Election Returns (1789-2006) from the Wilkes University Election Statistics Project

Elections
United States Senate elections
 
Pennsylvania